Abraham Seraphim is a Metropolitan of Bangalore Diocese of Malankara Orthodox Syrian Church.

References

1969 births
Living people
Malankara Orthodox Syrian Church bishops